Wiedemann & Berg Film is a German film production company founded by Quirin Berg and Max Wiedemann in 2003. The company's first movie The Lives of Others won the Academy Award for Best Foreign Language Film in 2007.

History 
In 2003, while still studying at the Hochschule für Fernsehen und Film München (The University of Television and Film Munich), Quirin Berg and Max Wiedemann founded Wiedemann & Berg Film. W&B Television followed in 2010. Since January 2020, both companies are part of the newly founded studio Leonine. Quirin Berg and Max Wiedemann are shareholders and founding members of the studio and, as Leonine Holding's managing directors and chief production officers, lead the group's entire fiction production.

Their first big feature film, the directing debut of Florian Henckel von Donnersmarck, The Lives of Others, received the Oscar for Best Foreign Language Film in 2007, followed by Never Look Away, which was nominated for two Academy Awards in 2019. Other cinematic hits include Baran bo Odar's hacking thriller Who am I or Simon Verhoeven's comedy Welcome to Germany, which, with over 3 million theatergoers, was the most successful German film in 2016. Nightlife, which opened in theaters on February 13, 2020, marked the fifth collaboration with Simon Verhoeven.

Next to traditional production formats for free TV or linear television, Wiedemann & Berg has also positioned itself as the first German company within the new market of pay television and video on demand. In 2012, the first German self-produced pay TV show was created for TNT Serie, followed by 4 Blocks. Wiedemann & Berg also produced Dark, the first German Netflix Original and Pagan Peak, one of the first originals for Sky Deutschland. Tribes of Europa is yet another big series that's being produced for Netflix.

Quirin Berg and Max Wiedemann are members of Deutsche Filmakademie, British Film Academy as well as European Film Academy.

Awards and accolades 
Wiedemann & Berg Film and Wiedemann & Berg Television's producers and productions have received an Academy Award, Auszeichnung der Deutschen Akademie für Fernsehen (Award of the German Academy for TV), BAFTA, Bayerischer Fernsehpreis (Bavarian TV Award), Bayerischer Filmpreis (Bavarian Film Award), César, European Film Award, Hollywood Reporter Award, Deutscher Fernsehpreis (German TV Award), Deutscher Filmpreis (German Film Award), Fernsehfilmpreis der Deutschen Akademie der Darstellenden Künste (TV Film Award of the German Academy of Performing Arts), Goldene Kamera (Golden Camera), Grimme-Preis (Grimme Award), LA Critics Award, Magnolia Award, Rockie Award, Romy and Golden Globe.

References

External links 
 Wiedemann & Berg Filmproduktion on IMDb
 W&B Television on IMDb
 w-b-film.de
 w-b-television.de

Film production companies of Germany
German companies established in 2003
Companies based in Munich